Tata Steel Zoological Park (TSZP) is situated in a corner of Jubilee Park, Jamshedpur.

TSZP is a recognized 'Medium' category Zoo by the Central Zoo Authority (CZA). The CZA evaluates Zoos on periodic basis and stipulates conditions for their improvement. TSZP has been evaluated by CZA at periodic intervals and major recommendations to meet the prescribed standards are creation of a veterinary hospital with postmortem room and incinerator, shifting of animal enclosures, separate entry and exit gates for visiting public, strengthening perimeter wall etc. CZA had approved the new layout plan of the Zoological Park in July 2020. However, the plan for its implementation got delayed due to Covid, and the work commenced in 2022. The entire project has been phased out and it is likely to be completed by the year 2025.

Recently, Tata Steel Zoological Park was remodeled, and was inaugurated by Tata Steel MD and CEO TV Narendran on 7 January 2022.

Animals and exhibits 
The zoo is home to about 432 individual animals representing 49 species, including 19 species of mammals, 26 species of birds, and 4 species of reptiles. There are other animals planned to be housed by the Zoological Park in the future which consist of Giraffe, Mouse Deer, Indian gaint Squirrel, Sarus crane, Demoiselle crane, Rosy Pelican, Adjutant stork, Military Macaw, Yellow Monitor & Indian Rock Python snake.

Mammals 

 Sloth bear
 Blackbuck
 Indian hog deer
 Gray langur
 Leopard
 Bonnet macaque
 Rhesus macaque
 Bengal tiger
 Sambar deer
 Chital
 Indian muntjac
 Nilgai
 Striped hyena
 Hippopotamus
 Mandrill
 Indian crested porcupine
 African Lion
 Grant's zebra

Birds 

 Peafowl
 Common hill myna
 Grey junglefowl
 Cockatiel
 Bar-headed goose
 Black-headed ibis
 Rainbow lorikeet
 Alexandrine parakeet
 Rose-ringed parakeet
 Red-breasted parakeet
 Red junglefowl
 Silver pheasant
 Reeves's pheasant
 Lady Amherst's pheasant
 Common pheasant
 Emu
 Ostrich
 Sulphur-crested cockatoo
 Grey parrot
 Great white pelican
 Indian eagle-owl
 Budgerigar
 Java sparrow
 Helmeted guineafowl
 Japanese quail

Reptiles 

 Gharial
 Mugger crocodile
 Red-eared slider
 Indian star tortoise

Gallery

See also 
 P&M Hi-Tech City Centre Mall
 Dalma Wildlife Sanctuary
 Rankini Temple, Jadugora
 Jubilee Park, Jamshedpur

References
 
https://cza.nic.in/

https://tatazoo.com

External links
https://tatazoo.com/
 https://avenuemail.in/remodeled-tata-zoo-opens-in-jamshedpur/
 https://sharpbharat.com/information/tata-steel-new-gift-to-jamshedpur-new-entrance-gate-of-tata-zoo-opened

Zoos in India
Parks in India
Jharkhand
Jamshedpur